Stephen II (Step'anoz II), of the Chosroid dynasty, was a presiding prince of Iberia (Kartli, eastern Georgia) from 637/642 to c. 650.

The son and successor of Adarnase I, Stephen pursued his father's pro-Byzantine politics and was probably bestowed by the Emperor with the title of patricius. In 645, however, he was forced to recognize the Caliph as his suzerain when the Arabs moved into Georgia. He was succeeded by his son, Adarnase II.

The exterior stone plaque of the church of the Holy Cross at Mtskheta, Georgia, mentions the principal builders of this church: Stephanos the patricius, Demetrius the hypatos, and Adarnase the hypatos who have traditionally been equated by the Georgian scholars with Stephen I, son of Guaram; Demetre, brother of Stephen I and Adarnase I. However, an opinion expressed by Professor Cyril Toumanoff disagrees with this view by identifying these individuals with Stephen II, Demetre (brother of Stephen I), and Adarnase II (son of Stephen II), respectively.

References

Princes of Iberia
7th-century monarchs in Asia
Patricii
Chosroid dynasty